This is a list of the main career statistics of professional American tennis player Sloane Stephens. She was the women's singles champion at the 2017 US Open and runner-up at the 2018 French Open and 2018 WTA Finals.

Performance timelines

Only main-draw results in WTA Tour, Grand Slam tournaments, Fed Cup/Billie Jean King Cup and Olympic Games are included in win–loss records.

Singles
Current through the 2023 Indian Wells Open.

Doubles

Significant finals

Grand Slam tournaments

Singles: 2 (1 title, 1 runner-up)

WTA Championships finals

Singles (1 runner-up)

WTA 1000 finals

Singles: 2 (1 title, 1 runner-up)

WTA career finals

Singles: 10 (7 titles, 3 runner-ups)

Doubles: 1 (runner-up)

National representation

Fed Cup participation
Current through the 2020 Fed Cup Qualifying Round.

Singles: 12 (7–5)

Doubles: 2 (1–1)

Olympic Games

Singles: 1 (0–1)

ITF Circuit finals

Singles: 2 (1 title, 1 runner–up)

Junior career

Grand Slam finals

Doubles: 4 (3 titles, 1 runner-up)

WTA Tour career earnings
As of 15 November 2021

Career Grand Slam statistics

Seedings
The tournaments won by Stephens are in boldface, and advanced into finals by Stephens are in italics.

Best Grand Slam results details

Record against other players

Record against top 10 players
Stephens's record against players who have been ranked in the top 10. Active players are in boldface.

Top 10 wins

Notes

References

External links

Tennis career statistics